Céline Bonnier (born August 31, 1965) is a French Canadian actress from Quebec. She has been nominated for four awards including Genie Awards and Gemini Awards.

Filmography
 1992: Tectonic Plates
 1994: The Wind from Wyoming (Le Vent du Wyoming) : "Manon Mentha"
 1994: Million Dollar Babies (TV) : "Elzire Dionne"
 1995: Le Sphinx : "Angie"
 1996: Caboose : "Camille"
 1997: Le Masque (série TV) : "Louise Gabriel"
 1997: The Assignment : "Carla"
 1998: La Femme Nikita (série télévisée) : Off Profile: "Andrea Kosov"
 2000: Tag (série TV) : "Melanie Jobin"
 2000: The Orphan Muses (Les Muses orphelines) : "Martine Tanguay"
 2001: On Your Head (Le Ciel sur la tête)
 2002: Tag - Épilogue (série TV) : "Mélanie Jobin"
 2002: Le Dernier chapitre (feuilleton TV) : "Wendy Desbiens"
 2002: Random Passage (feuilleton TV) : "Ida Norris"
 2002: Le Dernier chapitre: La Suite (feuilleton TV) : "Wendy Desbiens"
 2002: Tag II (série TV) : "Melanie Jobin"
 2002: Séraphin: Heart of Stone (Séraphin: un homme et son péché): "Nanette"
 2003: Far Side of the Moon (La Face cachée de la lune): "Nathalie"
 2004: The Last Tunnel (Le Dernier Tunnel): "Annie Beaudoin"
 2004: Machine Gun Molly (Monica la mitraille): "Monica"
 2005: L'Héritière de grande ourse (feuilleton TV) : "Denise/Dora"
 2005: The United States of Albert (Les États-Unis d'Albert): "Hannah Steinway"
 2005: Human Trafficking (feuilleton TV): "Sophie"
 2006: A Sunday in Kigali (Un dimanche à Kigali) : "Élise"
 2006: Deliver Me (Délivrez-moi): "Annie"
 2006: A Family Secret (Le secret de ma mère) : "Jeanne"
 2008: Truffes: "Alice"
 2008: Mommy Is at the Hairdresser's (Maman est chez le coiffeur): "La Mère - Simone Gauvin "
 2010: Les Rescapés: "Gina McCrae"
 2014: Love Project (Love Projet)
 2015: The Passion of Augustine (La Passion d'Augustine)
 2016: Kiss Me Like a Lover (Embrasse-moi comme tu m'aimes)
 2018: For Those Who Don't Read Me (À tous ceux qui ne me lisent pas)
 2021: North of Albany (Au nord d'Albany)
 2021: The Time Thief (L'Arracheuse de temps)
 2022: A Criminial Affair (Une Affaire Criminelle)

External links

1965 births
Actresses from Quebec
Canadian film actresses
Canadian television actresses
French Quebecers
Living people
People from Lévis, Quebec
Best Actress Jutra and Iris Award winners
20th-century Canadian actresses
21st-century Canadian actresses
Best Supporting Actress Jutra and Iris Award winners